is a soccer simulation game, developed by Nihon Syscom and published by Yojigen, which was released exclusively in Japan in 1995. It features teams from the Japanese high schools from the islands in addition to the mainland.

This game is a sequel to Zenkoku Kōkō Soccer and a prequel to Zenkoku Kōkō Soccer Senshuken '96.

Reception
On release, the game was scored a 20 out of 40 by a panel of four reviewers at Famicom Tsūshin.

See also
 All Japan High School Soccer Tournament

References

 Zenkoku Kōkō Soccer 2 at GameFAQs
 全国高校サッカー2 at superfamicom.jp
 Zenkoku Kōkō Soccer 2 at superfamicom.org

1995 video games
Yojigen games
High school association football video games
Japan-exclusive video games
Super Nintendo Entertainment System games
Super Nintendo Entertainment System-only games
Video games developed in Japan
Video games set in Japan
Video game sequels
Multiplayer and single-player video games